Guatemala requires its residents to register their motor vehicles and display vehicle registration plates. Current plates are North American standard 6 × 12 inches (152 × 300 mm).

In January 2021, Guatemala introduced a new license plate, similar to those of Mercosur, as well as neighboring Honduras. The typeface used is FE-Schrift.

See also
Vehicle registration plates of Honduras
Vehicle registration plates of the Mercosur

References

Guatemala
Transport in Guatemala
Guatemala transport-related lists